Founded in and published beginning in 1979 by the late Guy Spiro, a skilled astrologer, The Monthly Aspectarian was a free print and later online magazine featuring the daily “Astro-Weather” for the upcoming month. It was based in Morton Grove, a suburb of Chicago, and published under the auspices of Lightworks.com. Additionally, the monthly periodical was distributed in the Milwaukee, Wisconsin area, northwestern Indiana and northern Illinois, as well as nationwide by subscription.

The magazine described itself as "dedicated to awakening consciousness, with the focus of our efforts being in the areas of personal growth, healthy and holistic living, spiritual transformation, and global awareness."  The Monthly Aspectarian was revived in November 2012 as Conscious Community Magazine. The original Monthly Aspectarian had a large section so named featuring a wide variety of diverse modalities from acupuncture to zen meditation.

References

1979 establishments in Illinois
2012 disestablishments in Illinois
Monthly magazines published in the United States
Online magazines published in the United States
Defunct magazines published in the United States
Free magazines
Magazines on astrology
Magazines established in 1979
Magazines disestablished in 2012
Magazines published in Chicago